Duodji is a traditional Sami handicraft, dating back to a time when the Sami were far more isolated from the outside world than they are today. Duodji tools, clothing and accessories are intended to primarily be functional, but may also incorporate artistic elements. Some examples include knives, cases, ladies' bags, wooden cups, and articles of clothing. Duodji items were made and meant to be used in an everyday work environment.

Materials used
Traditionally Sami handicraft was divided into two sub-groups, men's and women's handicraft. Men used mostly wood and antlers as well as other bones from reindeer when crafting, while women used leather and roots. The traditional Sami colours are red, green, blue and yellow.

Well known artists
Duodji artists are still active in Sapmi and still carry on the traditions of the Duodji. Although there have been slight changes in the traditional Duodji, today they are considered valuable pieces of art by collectors from all over the world. Some modern Duodji artists are Olov Svonni, Martin Kuorak, Anders Sunna, Lars Pirak, Per Isak Juuso and Per Olof Utsi.

Gákti

The traditional costume, the gákti, is of great cultural importance and is mainly used for weddings, funerals, confirmations and other cultural events. The gákti's appearance differs from place to place and it tends to be longer in southern Sápmi than in the north. Traditionally leather, sinews, and wool was used to make the gákti. Today, however both velvet and silk can be used.

Gallery

See also
 Kuksa
 Gákti

External links
 Duodji at Design-Handverk 
 Doudji Institute: https://web.archive.org/web/20090819063819/http://www.duodji.info/english/index.php?sladja=46 Retrieved Jan/29/2008
 Sameslöjdstiftelsen (Sami Duodji Association): https://web.archive.org/web/20080116222630/http://www.sameslojdstiftelsen.com/?p=42 Retrieved Jan/29/2008

Sámi culture
Sámi art
Handicrafts
Sámi-language terms